Tracy Daugherty is an American author.  He is Distinguished Professor of English and Creative Writing at Oregon State University. He has held fellowships from the Guggenheim Foundation and the National Endowment for the Arts.

Daugherty has written biographies of several important American writers of the mid-20th century. These include Hiding Man, his biography of his former teacher, the short-story author and novelist Donald Barthelme (1931–1989); Just One Catch, about the novelist Joseph Heller (1923–1999), author of Catch-22; and The Last Love Song, about the non-fiction essayist and novelist Joan Didion (b. 1932).

Daugherty is a contributor to The New Yorker, McSweeney's, and The Georgia Review. His other published work includes the volumes What Falls Away (1996), which won the Oregon Book Award, and The Boy Orator. His first novel, Desire Provoked (1987) was acclaimed as "impressive" and "exquisitely accurate" by novelist Ron Loewinsohn in The New York Times.

Bibliography

Fiction

Novels 

 Desire Provoked (1986)
 What Falls Away (1996)
 The Boy Orator (1999)
 Axeman's Jazz (2003)

Story Collections 

 The Woman in the Oil Field (1996)
 It Takes a Worried Man (2002)
 Late in the Standoff (2005)
 One Day the Wind Changed (2010)
 The Empire of the Dead (2014)
 American Originals (2016)

Nonfiction

Biographies 

 Hiding Man: A Biography of Donald Barthelme (2009)
 Just One Catch: A Biography of Joseph Heller (2011)
 The Last Love Song: A Biography of Joan Didion (2015)
 Leaving the Gay Place: Billy Lee Brammer and the Great Society (2018)

Essays 

 Five Shades of Shadow (2003)
 Let Us Build Us a City (2017)

External links
Interview with Daugherty
Official Author Website
Tracy Daugherty Oral History Interview

References

Living people
American male novelists
Year of birth missing (living people)